Magdalis austera is a species of wedge-shaped bark weevil in the beetle family Curculionidae. It is found in North America.

Subspecies
These two subspecies belong to the species Magdalis austera:
 Magdalis austera austera Fall, 1913
 Magdalis austera substriga Fall, 1913

References

Further reading

 
 

Curculionidae
Articles created by Qbugbot
Beetles described in 1913